Bangiales is an order of red algae in the class Bangiophyceae.

References

Red algae orders
Bangiophyceae